Duncan Bluff is a steep rock bluff along the north side of Hatherton Glacier. In association with the names of communication workers grouped in this area, it was named after Patrick Duncan Smith of the Office of Polar Programs, National Science Foundation, 1995–2001, an information technology specialist for the United States Antarctic Program with responsibility for projects that access communication satellites as well as for Antarctic communication with the outside world.

References 

Cliffs of Oates Land